Banihal Pass (Hindi: बनिहाल दर्रा,) is a mountain pass across the Pir Panjal Range in India at a maximum elevation of . It connects the Kashmir Valley in the Indian union territory of Jammu and Kashmir to the outer Himalaya and the plains to the south. In the Kashmiri language, "Banihāl" means blizzard.

The road from Jammu to Srinagar transversed Banihal Pass until 1956 when the Jawahar Tunnel was constructed under the pass. The road now passes through the tunnel and the Banihal Pass is no longer used for road transport.

The Banihal Pass is the place where the scene changes and you will see a sharp change in nature and mountains. The natural surroundings of Kashmir reveal themselves as you travel through the Banihal and Jehlum valley roads. 

Zaban Glacier is a famous hill station located in the Sanglaab Valley, close to the Banihal Pass. This glacier is situated to the west of the village of Khairkoot. The glacier is almost 2 km long in the lap of Sundur Top (3,660 m above sea level)
Zaban Glacier is also the origin of Bachliri Nallaha, the main tributary of the Chenab River. Local tourists visit this glacier from March to mid-May. The glacier is connected by road to the Jammu-Srinagar National Highway, en route from Nowgam. It is almost 3 km from Nowgam and 2 km from Sanglaab colony.

References

Mountain passes of Jammu and Kashmir